KUHB-FM is a non-commercial radio station in St. Paul, Alaska, broadcasting on 91.9 FM. The station airs public radio programming from the National Public Radio network and the BBC World Service. KUHB also airs some locally originated programming.

KUHB carries daily news programming from KMXT in Kodiak and from the Alaska Public Radio Network. KUHB also airs Pacifica's Democracy Now program in the mornings.

See also
List of community radio stations in the United States

External links
 KUHB official website
 KUHB Facebook Page

UHB-FM
KUHB-FM
UHB-FM
Radio stations established in 1986
1986 establishments in Alaska
Community radio stations in the United States
Saint Paul Island (Alaska)